Liobagrus marginatoides is a species of catfish in the family Amblycipitidae (the torrent catfishes) endemic to the province of Sichuan in China. This species reaches a length of  SL.

References 

Liobagrus
Freshwater fish of China
Endemic fauna of Sichuan
Fish described in 1930